The Minister of Foreign Affairs was a government minister in charge of the Ministry of Foreign Affairs of North Yemen (common name for the Yemen Arab Republic), in what is now northern Yemen. The Minister was responsible for conducting foreign relations of the country.

List of ministers
The following is a list of foreign ministers of North Yemen from 1962 until the unification in 1990:

For ministers of foreign affairs of unified Yemen after 1990, see Ministry of Foreign Affairs (Yemen).

See also
 Minister of Foreign Affairs of South Yemen

References

 
North Yemen
North Yemen
1962 establishments in North Yemen
1990 disestablishments in Yemen